The Gaon Digital Chart, part of Gaon Music Chart, is a chart that ranks the best-performing songs in South Korea. The data is collected by the Korea Music Content Association. It consists of weekly (listed from Sunday to Saturday), monthly and yearly charts. Below is a list of songs that topped the weekly and monthly charts. The Digital Chart ranks songs according to their performance on the Gaon Download, Streaming, and BGM charts.

Weekly charts

Monthly charts

References

External links 
  Current Gaon Digital Chart

2016 singles
Korea, South singles
2016 in South Korean music